Sergio Fiszman (born 17 October 1955) is an Argentine former wrestler. He competed in two events at the 1976 Summer Olympics.

References

External links
 

1955 births
Living people
Argentine male sport wrestlers
Olympic wrestlers of Argentina
Wrestlers at the 1976 Summer Olympics
Place of birth missing (living people)
20th-century Argentine people
21st-century Argentine people